Masoala is a genus of flowering plant in the family Arecaceae.

Masoala may also refer to:

Masoala, Madagascar, a village in North Madagascar, on the South coast of the Masoala Peninsula
Masoala Peninsula, in North Madagascar
Cape Masoala, the easternmost point of Madagascar
Masoala National Park, on the Masoala Peninsula

See also
Masoala fork-crowned lemur (Phaner furcifer)